HMS Charity was a  destroyer of the Royal Navy laid down by John I. Thornycroft and Company of Woolston, Southampton on 9 July 1943. She was launched on 30 November 1944 and commissioned on 19 November 1945. She was sold to the US Navy in 1958, for transfer to the Pakistan Navy as a part of the Military Aid Program.

Renamed Shah Jahan, the ship was badly damaged in a strike by Indian Navy missile boats during the Indo-Pakistan War of 1971, and scrapped as a result.

History in the Royal Navy
Commissioned too late for service in the Second World War, Charitys pennant number was soon changed to D29. She formed part of the 14th (later 1st) Destroyer Squadron for service in the Mediterranean. She saw service, along with other Royal Navy ships in preventing illegal immigration into Palestine in 1947.

Following the outbreak of hostilities Charity served during the Korean War, where she joined the 8th Destroyer Flotilla. She steamed  during the war, and her actions included destroying a train. The destroyer received a slight modernization, which involved the removal of one of her rear gun turrets ('X' mounting) which was replaced by mountings for two Squid anti-submarine launchers, which replaced her depth charges. She paid off into reserve in 1955.

History in the Pakistan Navy

Charity was sold to the United States Navy on 16 June 1958, for further transfer to the Pakistan Navy. She was renamed USS Shah Jehan. She was modernized by J. Samuel White in Cowes, England under a US contract and transferred to the Pakistan Navy as part of the Military Assistance Program on 16 December 1958 where she served as Shah Jahan (literally, "Emperor of the World", after Shah Jahan).

Indo-Pakistan War of 1971

During the Indo-Pakistan War of 1971, Shah Jahan was escort to the cargo ship MV Venus Challenger carrying ammunition sent by the United States for the war effort from Saigon to Karachi.

On the night of 4 December 1971, the Indian Navy launched a fast naval strike called Operation Trident on the Pakistani Naval Headquarters of Karachi.

At 2300 hours, Nipat fired 2 SS-N-2 Styx missiles at Shah Jahan and Venus Challenger. The ammunition aboard Venus Challenger exploded when the ship was hit by the missile, and the vessel quickly sunk. Shah Jahan was also struck by the missile and was irreparably damaged. She was towed back to Karachi and scrapped.

The Pakistani destroyer Khaibar and minesweeper  were also sunk in the operation. The missile boats then hit the fuel storage tanks at Karachi harbour, setting them ablaze.

References

Publications
 
 

 

C-class destroyers (1943) of the Royal Navy
Ships built in Southampton
1944 ships
World War II destroyers of the United Kingdom
Cold War destroyers of the United Kingdom
Korean War destroyers of the United Kingdom
C-class destroyers (1943) of the Pakistan Navy
Maritime incidents in 1971
Ships built by John I. Thornycroft & Company